Temperoceras is a genus of orthoconic nautiloid cephalopods that lived in what is now north Africa, Europe, and Asia during the early Paleozoic. It was named by I. V. Barskov in 1960.

Taxonomy
Temperoceras is included in the orthocerid family Geisonoceratidae the type is Orthoceras ludense

Morphology
Temperoceras has an orthoconic shell with a tubular siphuncle that contains annular deposits that are restricted to or begin at the septal openings.

Distribution
Temperoceras has been found in sediments ranging in age from Ordovician to Devonian in north Africa, southern Europe, and China.

References

Prehistoric nautiloid genera
Ordovician first appearances
Devonian extinctions
Orthocerida